Gu Lingyi (born 3 July 1991) is a Chinese professional Go player.

Lingyi became a professional in 2002. He won his first title, the South-West Qiwang, in 2007. He challenged for the Mingren title in 2009, but lost to Gu Li.

Promotion record

Career record
2006: 37 wins, 26 losses
2007: 39 wins, 23 losses
2009: 41 wins, 20 losses
2010: 40 wins, 34 losses
2011: 15 wins, 7 losses

Titles and runners-up

References

1991 births
Living people
Chinese Go players